John Walker-Smith is a gastroenterologist well known for his work in pediatrics. From 1985 until his retirement in 2001, he was professor of pediatric gastroenterology at the University of London. He also formerly served as the editor-in-chief of the Journal of Pediatric Gastroenterology and Nutrition.

MMR vaccine controversy
Walker-Smith is the senior co-author of a paper (along with Andrew Wakefield, the lead author) which claimed a unique gastrointestinal condition in autistic children that may be connected to the MMR vaccine. This study is generally regarded as sparking the MMR vaccine controversy.

In 2010, Walker-Smith was found guilty by the General Medical Council of professional misconduct who recommended erasure subject to appeal. As a result, he was barred from practicing medicine. On appeal, the case heard by Mr. Justice Mitting in the High Court stated that the GMC determinations were superficial and  inadequate and so were quashed.

In a statement reported in the book on the fraud by Brian Deer Walker-Smith said:

References

Academics of the University of London
Autism researchers
British gastroenterologists
Living people
Medical journal editors
British paediatricians
British medical researchers
Year of birth missing (living people)
MMR vaccine and autism